Kurin (also spelled Korin) is a village in northern Syria, administratively part of the Idlib Governorate, located southwest of Idlib. Nearby localities include the district center Ariha and Nahlaya to the southeast, Maataram and Urum al-Jawz to the south, Basanqul to the southwest, Ayn Shib to the northwest and Faylun to the northeast. According to the Syria Central Bureau of Statistics, Kurin had a population of 5,488 in the 2004 census.

References

Populated places in Ariha District